Kızılca is a town in Bor district of Niğde Province, Turkey. At  it is situated in Central Anatolian plains. The population of Kızılca was 1065 as of 2012. The settlement was founded in 1700s by a Turkmen tribe from Dulkadir Eyalet (east of present location)  upon Ottoman sultan's decree. In 1956 it was declared a seat of township. |The major economic activity is agriculture. Main crops are cereals, apple, potato and sugar beet. Animal husbandry is a secondary activity

References 

Towns in Turkey
Populated places in Niğde Province
Bor District, Niğde